Mahdi Camara (born 30 June 1998) is a French professional footballer who plays as a midfielder for  club Brest, on loan from  club Saint-Étienne.

Club career
A product from the club's youth academy, Camara signed his first professional contract with Saint-Étienne on 15 March 2018. He made his professional debut with ASSE in a 2–1 Ligue 1 win over Guingamp on 11 August 2018.  In January 2019, he was loaned to Laval until the end of the season.

Under manager Claude Puel, Camara was Saint-Étienne's captain. However, with the arrival of Pascal Dupraz in December 2021, he was stripped of the captain's armband. On 26 August 2022, Camara joined Ligue 1 side Brest on a season-long loan with an option-to-buy for a reported fee of €3.5 million.

International career
Having played for France at youth levels. He was called up to the Gambian provisional squad ahead of the 2021 Africa Cup of Nations, but he was not on the final list of 28 players called up by coach Tom Saintfiet.

Personal life
Camara was born in France and is of Gambian descent.

In early April 2022, Camara was suspended from Saint-Étienne's squad for five days after having been involved in a physical fight with reserve goalkeeper Yanis Bourbia. Camara broke Bourbia's nose and split his lip, which caused him to be hospitalized. The cause of the fight was tensions between the Camara and Bourbia families in the stands of the Stade Geoffroy-Guichard during a match against Marseille several days earlier.

Honours 
Saint-Étienne

 Coupe de France runner-up: 2019–20

References

External links
 
 
 
 

1998 births
Living people
People from Martigues
Sportspeople from Bouches-du-Rhône
French footballers
France youth international footballers
French sportspeople of Gambian descent
Black French sportspeople
Association football midfielders
Ligue 1 players
Ligue 2 players
Championnat National players
FC Martigues players
AS Saint-Étienne players
Stade Lavallois players
Stade Brestois 29 players
Footballers from Provence-Alpes-Côte d'Azur